Thomas Boghardt is a senior historian at the US Army Center of Military History.   Prior to this post, he served as the historian at the International Spy Museum in Washington, D.C., and, formerly, as a Thyssen fellow at Georgetown University.  He studied at Oxford University, St. Antony's College, where he received Ph.D. in European History in 1998.

Principal publications

Spies of the Kaiser, Palgrave MacMillan, 2004.
Zimmerman Telegram: Intelligence, Diplomacy, and America's Entry into World War I, Naval Institute Press, 2012.

Notes

American military historians
American male non-fiction writers
20th-century American historians
21st-century American historians
21st-century American male writers
Alumni of St Antony's College, Oxford
Living people
Year of birth missing (living people)